Barbershop arranging is the art of creating arrangements of barbershop music. The Barbershop Harmony Society (BHS) and Sweet Adelines International (SAI) have prescribed rules that dictate what is an acceptable arrangement, particularly with regard to singing in competition. This makes barbershop arranging a specialist form of arranging, rarely tackled by those outside barbershop; likewise, barbershop arrangers tend to be known only for their barbershop arrangements rather than for their work in any other musical form.

Technical requirements
The following 2 paragraphs from the BHS indicate technical requirements of a barbershop arrangement for use in a BHS contest:

So-called barbershop seventh chords should represent at least one third of the song’s duration. As an example of circle-of-fifths resolution, a tonic–subdominant progression will often use the tonic 7th instead, if it advances the forward motion of the song. Close harmony prevails and other commons chords include the diminished seventh, augmented sixth, and added sixth chords.

The quality of musical choices are vital to the success of a barbershop arrangement. A skillful arrangement, well executed, will provide the audience with an emotionally satisfying and entertaining experience.

Terms

A swipe is when one or more parts change pitch while the other parts hold their pitch. This provides rhythmic drive and either a chord change or a filling out of one chord. Swipes are on a single syllable.

For example, a filling out:
      Triad --> 7th chord --> Triad
 T    Third  =  Third      =  Third
 L    Root   =  Root       =  Root
 Bar. Fifth --> Seventh   --> Fifth
 B    Root  --> Fifth     --> Root

A tiddly is an embellishment in one or two voices over one chord, resembling neighbor tones or suspensions. This provides rhythmic drive, and may derive from black vocal improvisation.

Learning arranging
Anyone with a knowledge of music theory who can arrange should be able to write a barbershop arrangement. However, an understanding of the art form as it is practised and judged in competition is undoubtedly an advantage. A music category judge can assess an arrangement by ear or eye to test whether it is 'barbershop', and hence valid for use in competition. The BHS and its affiliated associations run courses in arranging at 'Harmony University' (formerly 'Harmony College'), which are open to members.

Relevant manuals: "Theory of Barbershop Harmony", "Barbershop Arranging Manual" and "Contest and Judging Manual" are published by the BHS.

See also
 A cappella music
 American Harmony Documentary Film about Barbershop music
 Sweet Adelines International

References

Barbershop music